Sir Martin Roth  (6 November 1917, Budapest – 26 September 2006, Cambridge) was a British psychiatrist.

He was Professor of Psychiatry, University of Cambridge, 1977–85, then Professor Emeritus, and was a Fellow of Trinity College, Cambridge from 1977.  He was one of the pioneers in developing Psychogeriatrics as a subspecialty. Roth was also a trustee of the Schizophrenia Research Fund, a charity founded by Miriam Rothschild.

He is buried in Cambridge City Cemetery.

Early life
Roth was born in Budapest, Austria-Hungary, on 6 November 1917. He was the son of a synagogue cantor.

Honours
Martin Roth was knighted in the 1972 New Year Honours List. He was elected a Fellow of the Royal Society (FRS) in 1996.

References

1917 births
2006 deaths
Knights Bachelor
Fellows of the Royal Society
Fellows of Trinity College, Cambridge
Hungarian Jews
Jewish scientists
British psychiatrists
Physicians from Budapest
Hungarian emigrants to the United Kingdom
Naturalised citizens of the United Kingdom
Burials at the Cambridge City Cemetery
Jewish psychiatrists